Handball at the Summer Olympics refers to two different sports. Field handball was introduced for men at the 1936 Summer Olympics in Berlin, but dropped after that. At the 1952 Olympics, field handball was a demonstration sport. (Indoor) handball was introduced for men at the 1972 Summer Olympics in Munich. Women's handball competition was introduced at the 1976 Summer Olympics in Montreal.

Men

Summary

Medal table

Participating nations

Women

Summary

Medal table

Participating nations

Combined medal table
The table below include teams under the name they had at the time. It should be mentioned, though, that URS and EUN is the same team like RUS and ROC is the same.

See also
List of Olympic venues in handball

References and notes

External links
Men's results
Women's results

 
Sports at the Summer Olympics
Olympics